Karlwernerius caroli is a species of beetle in the family Cerambycidae, and the only species in the genus Karlwernerius. It was described by Teocchi & al. in 2010.

References

Protonarthrini
Beetles described in 2010